The fourth series of The Voice เสียงจริงตัวจริง ( also known as The Voice Thailand ) on 6 September 2015. The show was hosted by Songsit Rungnopphakhunsi and Rinrani Siphen on Channel 3.

Teams
Colour key
  Winner
  Runners-up
  Third place
  Fourth place
  Eliminated in the Live shows
  Eliminated in the Knockouts
  Artist was stolen by another coach in the Battle rounds 
  Eliminated in the Battles

The Blind Auditions

Episode 1: Blind Auditions,  Week 1 
The first blind audition episode was broadcast on 6 September 2015.

Group performance: The voice Thailand's Coach –

Episode 2: Blind Auditions, Week 2 
The second blind audition episode was broadcast on 13 September 2015.

Episode 3: Blind Auditions, Week 3 
The second blind audition episode was broadcast on 20 September 2015.

Episode 4: Blind Auditions, Week 4 
The second blind audition episode was broadcast on 27 September 2015.

Episode 5: Blind Auditions, Week 5 
The second blind audition episode was broadcast on 4 October 2015.

Episode 6: Blind Auditions, Week 6 
The second blind audition episode was broadcast on 11 October 2015.

Battle Rounds

Episode 7–10: Battle Rounds
  – Battle winner
  – Battle loser
  – Battle loser but was saved by another coach

Knock outs
Italicized names are stolen contestants
 – Knockout winner
 – Eliminated artist

Episode 11–12: Knockouts

Live Performance

Episode 13: Live Playoff Week 1(29 November 2015)
  Advanced
  Eliminated

 Winner
 Runner-up
 Third Place
 Fourth Place

Episode 14: Live Playoff Week 2(6 December 2015)
  Advanced
  Eliminated

 Winner
 Runner-up
 Third Place
 Fourth Place

Episode 15: Final (13 December 2015)
 Winner
 Runner-up
 Third Place
 Fourth Place

References

External links
The official website

The Voice Thailand
2015 Thai television seasons